"Voyage" is the 28th single released by Ayumi Hamasaki on September 26, 2002. "Voyage" debuted at #1 on the weekly charts with more than 319,020 copies sold in its first week and remained at the top position for three consecutive weeks out of a total 28 weeks on the chart, becoming her longest-charting single. The single sold a total of 760,000 copies and became the ninth-best-selling single of the year. To date, "Voyage" is Ayumi Hamasaki's only single which has remained in the top position of the weekly Oricon charts for at least three weeks other than "H" and "A"; however, "Voyage" is Hamasaki's only single to stay at #1 for three consecutive weeks ("A" and "H" spent 3 non-consecutive weeks at #1). "Voyage" was used as the theme song of the Japanese film Tsuki ni Shizumu, which was created in lieu of a PV for the single. It was also used as the ending song of a Japanese television drama My Little Chef, starring Hiroshi Abe and Aya Ueto.

Track listing
 "Voyage" – 5:08
 "HANABI" (Electrical Bossa Mix) - 5:06
 "independent" (Sugiurumn Mix) - 5:46
 "Voyage" (Instrumental) – 5:08

PV

A regular PV for "Voyage" does not exist; however, Tsuki ni Shizumu, a short film starring Hamasaki was created for which "Voyage" was used as the theme song.

The video starts with a young woman named Minamo (played by Hamasaki) is at a mental institution and has recurring detailed visions of a traumatizing past life. Her visions include a lake with a large image of the moon shining down over it. She is crying tears of blood as she slowly sinks into the lake. She hears someone calling her name "Kagari" which was her name in her past life. At the mental hospital she eventually stumbles across a visitor which causes her to go wild and reach out to him as if she had already known him. The doctor believes that Minamo died a traumatizing death in her previous life and therefore she needs to become reunited with her soul mate in this life.

In her past life, there is a deranged madwoman who insists that Kagari (Minamo) must be sacrificed to the moon because a special full moon was approaching which only showed up once every hundred years. When the madwoman shows up with her goons to kill Kagari and sacrifice her to the moon, Kagari's soul mate Sonshin (played by Yūsuke Iseya) shows up to try and defend her. Kagari and Sonshin get away from the fiends and spend one final loving moment together. Soon after, the psychopathic woman and her group of minions track Kagari down and brutally kill Sonshin for trying to defend Kagari. Eventually the demented woman ends up getting Kagari and sacrificing her to the moon once and for all. This leads to a gorgeous scene in which Kagari sinks into the shining light of the moon on a lake.

Back in the present time, Minamo finds the lake where she was traumatically sacrificed to the moon in her past life. She meets up with the visitor from the hospital who was also the man in her visions: Sonshin, or Shōgo (in present). They briefly speak and realize that they were in fact each others' soul mates and become reunited for good. The video ends with Minamo and Shōgo hugging.

Charts
Oricon sales chart (Japan)

 RIAJ certification: 2× Platinum (sold), 3× Platinum (shipped)

External links
 Voyage information at Avex Network.
 Voyage information at Oricon.

Ayumi Hamasaki songs
2002 singles
2002 songs
Oricon Weekly number-one singles
Songs written by Ayumi Hamasaki
Songs written by Dai Nagao
Japanese television drama theme songs
Avex Trax singles